Rea Pittman is an Australian rugby league player who represented the  Cook Islands national rugby league team in the 2013 World Cup.

Playing career
Pittman works at Sydney Airport as a baggage handler. He is contracted to the Cronulla Sharks.

In 2013, Pittman was named in the Cook Islands squad for the World Cup.

References

1993 births
Australian rugby league players
Australian people of Cook Island descent
Cook Islands national rugby league team players
Rugby league centres
Living people